

Wigheah (or Sighaeh; died between 772 and 781) was a medieval Bishop of London.

Wigheah was consecrated between 766 and 772. He died between 772 and 781.

Citations

References

External links
 

Bishops of London
9th-century deaths
Year of birth unknown
8th-century English bishops